Pottery Addition is a census-designated place (CDP) in Jefferson County, Ohio, United States. Its population was 293 as of the 2010 census. The community is located along the Ohio River and is served by Ohio State Route 7.

Geography
Pottery Addition is in eastern Jefferson County, in the southeast corner of Island Creek Township. It is bordered to the east by the Ohio River, which serves as the border between Jefferson County, Ohio, and Hancock County, West Virginia. Weirton, West Virginia, is directly across the river. The southern tip of Pottery Addition touches the border of Steubenville, the Jefferson county seat. State Route 7, a four-lane freeway which runs through the community, leads north (upriver)  to Toronto and south  to the center of Steubenville.

Demographics

References

Census-designated places in Jefferson County, Ohio